Chernoff is a surname. Notable people with the surname include:

 Herman Chernoff applied mathematician, statistician and physicist
 Chernoff bound, also called Chernoff's inequality
 Chernoff face
 Chernoff's distribution
 Maxine Chernoff
 Mike Chernoff (disambiguation), two people
 Paul Chernoff (1942–2017), American mathematician

See also 
 Chernov
 Chernow